Frenchman Knob is a summit in Hart County, Kentucky, in the United States.

It was so named because a Frenchman was scalped upon it.

References

Landforms of Hart County, Kentucky
Mountains of Kentucky